Larry Alley (born September 23, 1948) is an American politician who has served in the Kansas Senate from the 32nd district since 2017. Following the removal on April 9, 2021 of Gene Suellentrop from the office of Majority Leader, Alley, who was the Republican Assistant Leader, succeeded him in an acting capacity. Rather than Suellentrop resigning his caucus position, Masterson had said most of Suellentrop's duties would be temporarily assigned to  Alley, "...until matters that I am currently dealing with are resolved." His statement avoided addressing those allegations against him.  The Republican caucus elected him permanent majority leader at the end of the 2021 legislative session. Alley indicated his priority was focused on redistricting.

References

External links
Vote Smart Larry Alley

1948 births
21st-century American politicians
Republican Party Kansas state senators
Living people
Pittsburg State University alumni
People from Douglass, Kansas